Jean-Baptiste-Étienne-Auguste Charcot (15 July 1867 – 16 September 1936), born in Neuilly-sur-Seine, was a French scientist, medical doctor and polar scientist. His father was the neurologist Jean-Martin Charcot (1825–1893).

Life
Jean-Baptiste Charcot was appointed leader of the French Antarctic Expedition with the ship Français exploring the west coast of Graham Land from 1904 until 1907. The expedition reached Adelaide Island in 1905 and took pictures of the Palmer Archipelago and Loubet Coast. From 1908 until 1910, another expedition followed with the ship Pourquoi Pas ?, exploring the Bellingshausen Sea and the Amundsen Sea and discovering Loubet Land, Marguerite Bay, Mount Boland and Charcot Island, which was named after his father, Jean-Martin Charcot. He named Hugo Island after Victor Hugo, the grandfather of his wife, Jeanne Hugo.

Later on, Jean-Baptiste Charcot explored Rockall in 1921 and Eastern Greenland and Svalbard from 1925 until 1936. He died when Pourquoi-Pas ? was wrecked in a storm off the coast of Iceland in 1936. A monument to Charcot was created in Reykjavík, Iceland by sculptor Einar Jónsson in 1936 and another by Ríkarður Jónsson in 1952.

Charcot participated in many sports. He won two silver medals in sailing at the Summer Olympics of 1900.

See also 
 Charcot Fan
 Charcot Land

References 

 Le "Pourquoi pas?" dans l'Antarctique 1908–1910, Arthaud, Paris, 1996,

External links

 Sur les traces du "Pourquoi-Pas?"
 Icelandic website in memory of Jean-Babtiste Charcot"
 

1867 births
1936 deaths
Captains who went down with the ship
People from Neuilly-sur-Seine
French explorers
Explorers of Antarctica
Explorers of the Arctic
Graham Land
Charcot family
20th-century French physicians
Grand Officiers of the Légion d'honneur
Academic staff of the École pratique des hautes études
Members of the French Academy of Sciences
Recipients of the Cullum Geographical Medal
Burials at Montmartre Cemetery
Antarctic Peninsula
French male sailors (sport)
Sailors at the 1900 Summer Olympics – 0 to .5 ton
Olympic sailors of France
Medalists at the 1900 Summer Olympics
Olympic silver medalists for France
Olympic medalists in sailing
Accidental deaths in Iceland
Sportspeople from Hauts-de-Seine
Sailors at the 1900 Summer Olympics – Open class